12 Hits para 2 guitarras flamencas y orquesta de cuerda (12 Hits for 2 Flamenco Guitars and a String Orchestra) is the fourth of four collaboration albums by Paco de Lucía and Ramón de Algeciras.

Track listing

Personnel 
Paco de Lucía – Flamenco guitar
Ramón de Algeciras – Flamenco guitar

References
 Gamboa, Manuel José and Nuñez, Faustino. (2003). Paco de Lucía. Madrid:Universal Music Spain.

1969 albums
Paco de Lucía albums
PolyGram albums
Instrumental albums
Collaborative albums